St Paul's Church, Shadwell, is a Grade II* listed Church of England church, located between The Highway and Shadwell Basin, on the edge of Wapping, in the East End of London, England. The church has had varying fortunes over many centuries, and is now very active, having been supported recently by Holy Trinity Brompton Church.

History

The old parish church, traditionally known as the Church of Sea Captains, was built in 1656, and was principally financed by Thomas Neale. It is believed that 75 sea captains are buried at the Church. Matthew Mead was minister of the chapel from 1658 until 1662, when he was replaced after the Restoration for being too non-conformist. During the Great Plague of London it was one of five sites in the parish of Stepney used as plague pits. It was rebuilt in 1669 as the Parish Church of Shadwell, and in an Act of 1670 by Archbishop of Canterbury William Sancroft, St Paul's Shadwell became a separate parish from St Dunstan's, Stepney, where it had previously been a hamlet. The church was named after St Paul's Cathedral, and became the first parish created from St Dunstan's, Stepney since Whitechapel in 1338. John Wesley was a preacher at St Paul's. Captain James Cook worshipped there, as did Jacob Phillip, the father of Captain Arthur Phillip, the first Governor of New South Wales. Cook's eldest son was baptised at St Paul's Church in 1763. Also baptised there were William Henry Perkin, the chemist who discovered the first aniline dye, and Jane Randolph, mother of Thomas Jefferson.

The church was demolished in 1817 and the present building, a Waterloo church designed by John Walters, was erected in 1821. It is the only building built by John Walters that still survives. In the 1840s, half of the churchyard land was bought by the London Dock Company in a compulsory purchase order, in order to expand Shadwell Basin.

After the churchyard closed to burials, it was laid out as a garden by Fanny Wilkinson on behalf of the Metropolitan Public Gardens Association in 1886. The design included a partially flagged area in front for recreation. Some London plane trees survive from the original design.

In 1950, the building became a Grade II* listed building.

Present 
In January 2005, a team from the congregation of Holy Trinity Brompton moved to Shadwell to minister with the existing members of St. Paul's in serving the local area. This follows a number of similar church plants from Holy Trinity Brompton to declining churches around London with the support of the Bishop of London. The Rev Ric Thorpe was licensed as the new Priest-in-Charge on 20 January 2005 with The Rev Jez Barnes assisting him as the associate pastor. Thorpe was appointed Rector in 2010, and left in 2015 to become the Bishop of Islington.

St Paul's stands in the charismatic and evangelical Anglican traditions.

References

External links
 Official website

Shadwell
Rebuilt churches in the United Kingdom
Churches completed in 1820
19th-century Church of England church buildings
London, Saint Pauls Church, Shadwell
Grade II* listed buildings in the London Borough of Tower Hamlets
Grade II* listed churches in London
Diocese of London
Holy Trinity Brompton plants
Shadwell